Claire Louise Malcolm (born 27 July 1982 in Tunbridge Wells, Kent) is an English menswear designer and is a designer on Savile Row. Malcolm graduated from Middlesex University with a BA in Fashion Design.

Early career

Kim Jones
In 2006 Malcolm began working for English Designer Kim Jones. Malcolm helped produce 4 collections for his main line Kim by Kim Jones. This collection was shown in New York City in February 2007, during the Men's Collections show. Malcolm has also assisted and collaborated with, Nicola Formichetti, Andre Walker, i-D Magazine, V Man, 10 Men and Arena Homme. She has also worked with Savile Row tailors Norton & Sons.

Kanye West (Pastelle)
Between 2008-09, Malcolm helped develop the fashion line, “Pastelle” for Kanye West.

E.Tautz
In 2009, Malcolm moved permanently to Savile Row, working for Patrick Grant of Norton & Sons as the designer for his E.Tautz label; a forgotten military brand from which Grant wanted to develop a ready to wear branch of his tailoring house. Between 2009-10, Malcolm designed both the SS10 and AW10 collections, subsequently winning E.Tautz the award for 'Best Menswear' at the British Fashion Awards 2010.

Hardy Amies
In 2010, Malcolm was offered the position of Designer  at the eponymous British fashion brand, Hardy Amies on Savile Row, presenting her first Salon show at London Fashion Week AW11. Malcolm drew on the period of Sir Edwin Hardy’s life when he was a prominent figure on the European society circuit in the 1930s:

References

External links
Hardy Amies Official
Hardy Amies Facebook Page
Hardy Amies Twitter Page
London fashion week at GQ Magazine

Living people
1982 births
English fashion designers
British women fashion designers
Menswear designers